GainSpan, a San Jose, California-based semiconductor company, designs and markets wireless connectivity products. It offers Wi-Fi chips, software, and embedded Wi-Fi modules. The company provides Wi-Fi technology for the residential housing, healthcare, and smart energy industries.

History
Engineers from  Intel Corporation created GainSpan in September 2006 with the goal of reducing the power consumption of traditional Wi-Fi. GainSpan was the first company to optimize Wi-Fi chips for low power consumption and to apply new power management techniques to target long battery life applications.

References

External links
http://www.gainspan.com

Companies based in San Jose, California
Semiconductor companies of the United States
Companies established in 2006